The 2011 Asian Women's Youth Handball Championship (4th tournament) took place in Yamaga, Japan from 23 September–28 September. It acts as the Asian qualifying tournament for the 2012 Women's Youth World Handball Championship.

Results

Final standing

References
www.handball.jp

External links
www.asianhandball.com

International handball competitions hosted by Japan
Asian Women's Youth Handball Championship, 2011
Asia
Asian Handball Championships